Freddie Miller may refer to:

Freddie Miller (broadcaster) (1929–1992), broadcaster and television personality in Atlanta, Georgia, United States
Freddie Miller (rugby league), British rugby league footballer of the 1940s and 1950s
Freddie Miller (boxer) (1911–1962), American boxer

See also
Fred Miller (disambiguation)